Yeliz Ay (born 9 November 1977 in Ankara, Turkey) is a Turkish female racewalker. She studied at Süleyman Demirel University.

She was the winner of the 5th Royal Leamington Spa EAA Race Walking Grand Prix in 2004, clocking 1:43.15. Ay was named the competition's best technical walker as well.

She is the holder of the national records in 5000m walk (track), 10000m walk (track), 20000m walk (track), 10 km walk (road) and 20 km walk (road).

Personal bests
According to IAAF database, her personal bests are:
10000m walk: 46:52.1 - Ankara (TUR),	06.02.2005
10 km walk: 46:12 - Dublin (IRE), 27.06.2004
20 km walk: 1:34:57 - Minsk (BLR), 08.07.2004

References

1977 births
Sportspeople from Ankara
Living people
Turkish female racewalkers
Athletes (track and field) at the 2004 Summer Olympics
Olympic athletes of Turkey
Süleyman Demirel University alumni